Francis Alexander (February 3, 1800 – March 27, 1880) was an American portrait-painter.

Biography
Alexander was born in Windham county Connecticut in February 1800. Brought up on a farm, he taught himself the use of colors, and in 1820 went to New York City and studied painting with Alexander Robertson.

He spent the winters of 1831 and 1832 in Rome. Afterwards, he resided for nearly a decade in Boston, Massachusetts, where he had considerable vogue, and where he painted a portrait of Charles Dickens (1842).

In 1840 he was elected to the National Academy of Design as an honorary member. There is a tradition that when Dickens visited Boston, a line of New England portraitists was already fawning on shore, hoping to be the first to capture the great novelist's image on canvas. But Francis Alexander reached the writer well ahead of his peers—by traveling in a small advance boat to greet Dickens as his vessel entered the harbor. American poet Henry Wadsworth Longfellow (whom Alexander also painted) would later coin the verb Alexandered (as in, wangled), sniffing that such and such a person had Alexandered his way into a highly coveted invitation to a party. Francis Alexander died in 1881 in Florence.

Family
Alexander married Lucia Grey Swett in 1836. Their daughter Francesca Alexander was a popular illustrator, author, and translator.

Works
One of Alexander's best portraits is that of Mrs. Fletcher Webster, formerly in the Boston Museum of Fine Arts. This romantic portrait, in which the sitter appears swathed in ermine, was deaccessioned from the Museum early in the 20th century and returned to descendants in the Sargent family.

Notes

References

Attribution:

External links 

 Francis Alexander at American Art Gallery
 Additional Biographical Info.
 Museum of Fine Art, Boston

1800 births
1881 deaths
People from Killingly, Connecticut
19th-century American painters
American male painters
American portrait painters
Artists from Boston
American expatriates in Italy
19th-century American male artists